Spare Rib was a second-wave feminist magazine, founded in 1972 in the United Kingdom, that emerged from the counter culture of the late 1960s as a consequence of meetings involving, among others, Rosie Boycott and Marsha Rowe. Spare Rib is now recognised as an iconic magazine, which shaped debate about feminism in the UK, and as such it was digitised by the British Library in 2015. The magazine contained new writing and creative contributions that challenged stereotypes and supported collective solutions. It was published between 1972 and 1993. The title derives from the Biblical reference to Eve, the first woman, created from Adam's rib.

History
The first issue of Spare Rib was published in London in June 1972. It was distributed by Seymour Press to big chains including W. H. Smith and Menzies — although Smith's refused to stock issue 13, due to the use of an expletive on the issue's back cover. Selling at first around 20,000 copies a month, it was circulated more widely through women's groups and networks. From 1976, Spare Rib was distributed by Publications Distribution Cooperative (PDC) to a network of radical and alternative bookshops.

The magazine's purpose, as described in its editorial, was to investigate and present alternatives to the traditional gendered roles of virgin, wife or mother.

The name Spare Rib started as a joke referring to biblical Eve being fashioned out of Adam’s rib, implying that a woman had no independence from the beginning of time. This held the witty, subversive connotations the editors had been looking for.

The Spare Rib Manifesto stated:

Early articles were linked closely with left-leaning political theories of the time, especially anti-capitalism and the exploitation of women as consumers through fashion. The covers were often of a striking design.
  
As the women's movement evolved during the 1970s, the magazine became a focus for sometimes acrimonious debate among members of the many streams that emerged within the movement, such as socialist feminism, radical feminism, revolutionary feminism, lesbian feminism, liberal feminism and black feminism. Spare Rib included contributions from well-known international feminist writers, activists and theorists, as well as stories about ordinary women in their own words. Articles tackled many different threads of feminism from many different angles. Subjects included "liberating orgasm", "kitchen sink racism", anorexia and the practice of female genital mutilation. The magazine reflected the sometimes turbulent debates about how best to tackle issues such as sexuality and racism.

Suffering from the effects of falling subscriptions and advertising revenue, Spare Rib ceased publication in 1993.

Editors 

Spare Rib became a collective by the end of 1973 (see Spare Rib Reader, edited by Marsha Rowe, and Rosie Boycott, A Nice Girl Like Me). The collective editorial policy was to: "collectively decide on articles that they publish, and work closely with the contributors. Accept articles from men only when there is no other resource available. 35p per copy."

Design
According to Marsha Rowe, one of the original magazine designers, the "look" of Spare Rib, which resulted in so many iconic and striking covers, was born out of necessity. It had to look like a women's magazine, yet with contents that did not reflect the conformist stereotyping of women. Spare Rib covers were often controversial. It had to suggest the familiarity of women's magazines – "like a good friend, intimate, loyal, supportive – while also being challenging, questioning, exciting and radical". The designers had to transform the name Spare Rib into a magazine title. They had to create the front cover look, and an overall style for the pages inside the magazine. The design had to be both stable and flexible, to allow for future change while retaining the feel and basic identity. Integral to every decision was cost. "Money and professionalism went hand in hand."

New, young illustrators and photographers were keen to work for the magazine, enjoying the challenge of finding a visual language to express the new ideas of the magazine.

Finding non-sexist advertising in accordance with the values of the magazine was another challenge.

Legacy
Scholar Laurel Foster wrote in 2022 at the 50th anniversary of Spare Ribs first issue: "The self-expression and persuasive writing of the pioneering magazine have their legacy in feminist media today....Because of its standing in feminist history, Spare Rib has become a touchstone for later feminist magazines. In their 2017 book Re-reading Spare Rib, Angela Smith and Sheila Quaid wrote that Spare Rib played a key role in the development of Second Wave feminist thought and its spread into the collective consciousness in society.

It was reported by The Guardian in April 2013 that the magazine was due to be relaunched, with the journalist Charlotte Raven at the helm. It was subsequently announced that while a magazine and website were to be launched, it would now have a different name.

In May 2015, the British Library put its complete archive of Spare Rib online. The project was led by Polly Russell, the curator behind an oral history of the women's liberation movement. The archive is presented with new views on the subject matter and themes curated by expert commentators. The British Library website describes the value of Spare Rib for current readers and researchers:

In February 2019, the British Library announced a possible suspension of access to the archive in the event of a no-deal Brexit, due to possible problems about copyright, but the suspension never occurred.

References

Sources
 An extensive collection of most if not all publications can be found in the Women's Library reference/reading room in London.
Feminist Publications Brief history of Spare Rib at Bristol University History Department. Retrieved June 2008.
Interview with Marsha Rowe. The first editor of feminist magazine Spare Rib interviewed by Claire Daly at The F-Word. 31 January 2008. Retrieved June 2008.
 Written by 1979–1984 editor of Spare Rib.
Article on Spare Rib by Hazel K. Bell from The National Housewives Register's Newsletter no. 19, Autumn 1975, pp. 10–11. Retrieved June 2008.

Further reading
 
 
 
 
  Documenting the history of the British magazine Trouble and Strife: The Radical Feminist Magazine, which ran from 1983 to 2002.

External links
British Library archive
The Spare Rib Manifesto at the British Library archive
Full, free-to-access, online archive hosted by the JISC Journal Archive
The Reunion. Marsha Rowe, Rosie Boycott, Angela Phillips, Marion Fudger and Anna Raeburn talk to Sue MacGregor about the early years], BBC Radio 4, September 2013.
Photo of Marsha Rowe and Rosie Boycott. Founders of Spare Rib, at the magazine's offices, 19 June 1972.

1972 establishments in the United Kingdom
1993 disestablishments in the United Kingdom
Anti-capitalism
British design
Monthly magazines published in the United Kingdom
Defunct political magazines published in the United Kingdom
Defunct women's magazines published in the United Kingdom
Design magazines
Feminism in the United Kingdom
Feminist magazines
Magazines established in 1972
Magazines disestablished in 1993
Magazines published in London
Second-wave feminism